Semicossyphus darwini is a species of ray-finned fish native to the tropical eastern Pacific Ocean. Common names include the Chilean sheepshead wrasse, the goldspot sheepshead or the Galapagos sheepshead wrasse.

Description
The dorsal fin has twelve spines and ten soft rays while the anal fin has three spines and twelve soft rays.

Distribution and habitat
S. darwini is native to the tropical eastern Pacific Ocean. Its range includes the Galápagos Islands and on the coast of South America, extends from Ecuador southward through Peru to northern Chile.

Ecology
The strong sharp teeth provide evidence of its diet as a benthic predator, and this is confirmed by the stomach contents which include fragments of shells and other coarse calcareous debris as well as detritus. Other large carnivorous fish dwelling in the kelp forest include the Peruvian morwong (Cheilodactylus variegatus), the Chilean sandperch Pinguipes chilensis, the sea chub Graus nigra, and the Cape redfish (Sebastes capensis). These fish are preyed on by the marine otter (Lontra felina) and the South American sea lion (Otaria flavescens).

Status
S. darwini is caught for food throughout its range and is fished commercially in the Galápagos Islands. It is a large, and probably a slow-growing, fish which makes it vulnerable to over exploitation. There was a decline of 80% in the Galapagos populations during the 1997–1998 El Niño event, but the fish stock recovered in the following year, making it likely that the fish had moved to deeper water during the adverse conditions. The International Union for Conservation of Nature considers that there is not enough evidence to assess the conservation status of this fish and has rated it as "data deficient".

References

External links
 

Semicossyphus
Fish of the Pacific Ocean
Fish of Chile
Fish described in 1842
Taxa named by Leonard Jenyns